Joseph J. Vodicka (March 4, 1921 – February 28, 1995) was an American football halfback who played two seasons in the National Football League with the Chicago Bears and Chicago Cardinals. He played college football at Illinois State University and attended Lane Technical College Prep High School in Chicago.

Joe Vodicka played from 1943 to 1945 during his career with the Chicago Bears and Chicago Cardinals. Vodicka ran for -1 yards in his career on 3 attempts, scoring 0 rushing touchdowns. He also caught 1 passes for 3 yards.

References

External links
Just Sports Stats

1921 births
1995 deaths
American football halfbacks
Camp Peary Pirates football players
Chicago Bears players
Chicago Cardinals players
Illinois State Redbirds football players
Players of American football from Chicago